Lipton Griffin (born 3 January 1955) is a Nevisian cricketer. He played in four first-class and three List A matches for the Leeward Islands in 1975/76 and 1976/77.

See also
 List of Leeward Islands first-class cricketers

References

External links
 

1955 births
Living people
Nevisian cricketers
Leeward Islands cricketers